The 1968 All-Ireland Minor Hurling Championship was the 38th staging of the All-Ireland Minor Hurling Championship since its establishment by the Gaelic Athletic Association in 1928.

Cork entered the championship as the defending champions.

On 1 September 1968 Wexford won the championship following a 2-13 to 3-7 defeat of Cork in the All-Ireland final. This was their third All-Ireland title and their first in two championship seasons. It remains their last All-Ireland success.

Results

Leinster Minor Hurling Championship

Quarter-finals

Semi-finals

Final

Munster Minor Hurling Championship

Quarter-finals

Semi-finals

Final

All-Ireland Minor Hurling Championship

Semi-final

Final

External links
 All-Ireland Minor Hurling Championship: Roll Of Honour

Minor
All-Ireland Minor Hurling Championship